Reginald Farley (born June 26, 1961 in Christ Church, Barbados) is a Barbadian politician and accountant who has served has President of the Senate of Barbados since 2020. He is the first Senate President of the Senate of Barbados.

References 

Living people
1961 births
People from Christ Church, Barbados
Barbadian politicians
Barbados Labour Party politicians
Barbadian accountants
Presidents of the Senate of Barbados
Members of the Senate of Barbados